Sloanbaataridae is a family of fossil mammals within the extinct order Multituberculata. Remains are known from the Upper Cretaceous of Mongolia. These small herbivores lived during the "age of the dinosaurs". This family is part of the suborder Cimolodonta. The family Sloanbaataridae was named by Kielan-Jaworowska, Z. in 1974.

References 
 Kielan-Jaworowska (1974), "Multituberculate succession in the Late Cretaceous of the Gobi Desert (Mongolia)", Palaeontologica Polonica, 30, p. 23-44.
 Kielan-Jaworowska, Z. & Hurum, J.H. (2001), "Phylogeny and Systematics of multituberculate mammals", Paleontology 44, p. 389-429.
 Much of this information has been derived from  Mesozoic Mammals: Djadochtatherioidea, an Internet directory.

Cimolodonts
Late Cretaceous first appearances
Late Cretaceous extinctions
Prehistoric mammal families